Landisburg is an unincorporated community in Fayette County, West Virginia, United States.

The community was named after H. M. Landis, a businessperson in the lumber industry. The Dr. John Hughart House was listed on the National Register of Historic Places in 2001.

References

Unincorporated communities in Fayette County, West Virginia
Unincorporated communities in West Virginia